Sally J. Andreae (born 16 September 1960) is a British former rower. She competed in the women's double sculls event at the 1988 Summer Olympics.

References

External links
 

1960 births
Living people
British female rowers
Olympic rowers of Great Britain
Rowers at the 1988 Summer Olympics